Santiago Tillo is a town and municipality in Oaxaca in south-western Mexico. The municipality covers an area of  km².  
It is part of the Nochixtlán District in the southeast of the Mixteca Region.

References

Municipalities of Oaxaca